Somerset and Dorset West was a European Parliament constituency covering all of Somerset in England, plus parts of Avon and western Dorset.

Prior to its uniform adoption of proportional representation in 1999, the United Kingdom used first-past-the-post for the European elections in England, Scotland and Wales. The European Parliament constituencies used under that system were smaller than the later regional constituencies and only had one Member of the European Parliament each.

It consisted of the Westminster Parliament constituencies (on their 1983 boundaries) of Bridgwater, Somerton and Frome, Taunton, Wells, West Dorset, Weston-super-Mare, Woodspring, and Yeovil.

The constituency replaced Somerset and parts of Wessex.  It was itself replaced by much of Somerset and North Devon and parts of Bristol and Dorset and East Devon in 1994.  These seats became part of the much larger South West England constituency in 1999.

Members of the European Parliament

Results

References

External links
 David Boothroyd's United Kingdom Election Results

European Parliament constituencies in England (1979–1999)
Politics of Dorset
Politics of Somerset
1984 establishments in England
1994 disestablishments in England
Constituencies established in 1984
Constituencies disestablished in 1994